Curlee is a surname or given name. Notable people with this name include the following:

Surname
Christina "Phazero" Curlee was a video game designer
Hannah Curlee, runner-up on Season 11 of The Biggest Loser 
Nancy Curlee, American soap opera writer

Given name
Curlee Brown, Sr. (1909 1976), African-American activist

See also

Curlee (disambiguation)
Curler (disambiguation)
Curlew (disambiguation)
Curley, name list
Curly, name list
Curli, protein